Milton Terrence Kelly (born November 30, 1947) is a Canadian novelist, poet and playwright.

Born in Toronto, Ontario, Kelly attended Parkdale Collegiate Institute, York University and the University of Toronto. His first novel, I Do Remember The Fall (1977),  was nominated for the Books in Canada First Novel Award. This book was followed by two novels from Black Moss Press followed: The More Loving One and The Ruined Season. Kelly's third novel A Dream Like Mine (1987) won the Governor General's Award for fiction and was made into the movie Clearcut. A book of poetry, Country You Can't Walk In, won the first Toronto Arts Council Award. Two other novels with Stoddart followed, Out of the Whirlwind and Save Me Joe Louis, as well as a book of short stories, All that Wild Wounding.

Among other collections M.T. Kelly's work was included in The Thinking Heart: Best Canadian Essays (1991) and The Saturday Night Traveller.

His play The Green Dolphin was performed at Theatre Passe Muraille.

A frequent contributor to The Globe and Mail, M.T. Kelly also worked as a reporter for the Moose Jaw Times-Herald.

In 2000, when his wife, Madam Justice Lynn King was diagnosed with breast cancer, and his publisher of 30 years, General Publishing, went bankrupt, M.T. Kelly stopped publishing. Another contributing factor was the death of his friend, colleague, and sometime editor, author Carole Corbeil.

Kelly remained silent after his wife's death in March 2005, but  Exile Editions then re-printed A Dream Like Mine in its Canadian Classics series with an introduction by native writer Daniel David Moses. Along with the reprinting of A Dream Like Mine Exile published a new book, Downriver, which contained poetry, a memoir, and a short story about the people in the memoir.

M.T. Kelly's papers are in the Thomas Fisher Rare Book Library archives at the University of Toronto.

Bibliography

Novels
I Do Remember the Fall - 1977
The Ruined Season - 1982
A Dream Like Mine - 1987
Out of the Whirlwind - 1995
Save Me, Joe Louis - 1998

Short stories
The More Loving One - 1980
Breath Dances Between Them - 1991

Poetry
Country You Can't Walk In - 1979

Drama
The Green Dolphin play - 1982

External links

1946 births
Living people
20th-century Canadian poets
Canadian male poets
20th-century Canadian dramatists and playwrights
20th-century Canadian novelists
Canadian male novelists
Canadian memoirists
University of Toronto alumni
Writers from Toronto
Governor General's Award-winning fiction writers
Canadian male dramatists and playwrights
20th-century Canadian male writers
Canadian male non-fiction writers